Darío Lezcano Mendoza (born 30 June 1990) is a Paraguayan professional footballer who plays for Chilean club Colo-Colo. He represented Paraguay at under-17 level from 2006 to 2007 and later at full international level from 2015 to 2017, scoring 4 goals during the 2018 FIFA World Cup qualifiers.

Club career

Early career
During the winter break of the 2010–11 Swiss Super League season Lezcano transferred from FC Wil to FC Thun. He scored his first goal for the club during his first appearance on 6 February 2011 in the 3–2 home defeat against FC Basel.

FC Luzern
During the winter break of the 2011–12 Swiss Super League season Lezcano transferred to Luzern. He played his team debut on 19 February 2012 in the goalless draw away against Lausanne-Sport.
In his second game on 25 February he scored his first two goals for his new club in the 2–0 home win against BSC Young Boys.

While playing for Luzern, Lezcano was banned eight matches for assaulting referee Fedayi San, who showed him a second yellow card. The player then pushed the referee's chest, knocking the red card out of his hand. Imposing the ban, the league said in a statement that "respect for referees is a fundamental part of the game."

FC Ingolstadt
Lezcano signed for FC Ingolstadt on 15 January 2016.

International career

Paraguay U17
Lezcano played the Sub17 Sudamericano 2007 in Ecuador for the Paraguay national under-17 football team.

Paraguay
Lezcano was selected for the Paraguay senior squad by Ramón Díaz and made his debut in the 2018 FIFA World Cup qualification match against Argentina on 15 October 2015.

Career statistics

Club

International goals
Scores and results list Paraguay's goal tally first, score column indicates score after each Lezcano goal.

References

External links

Profile at Swiss Football League Website 

1990 births
Living people
Paraguayan footballers
Association football forwards
Paraguay international footballers
Swiss Super League players
Bundesliga players
2. Bundesliga players
Liga MX players
Sportivo Trinidense footballers
FC Wil players
FC Thun players
FC Luzern players
FC Ingolstadt 04 players
FC Juárez footballers
Sportspeople from Asunción
Copa América Centenario players
Paraguayan expatriate footballers
Paraguayan expatriate sportspeople in Switzerland
Expatriate footballers in Switzerland
Paraguayan expatriate sportspeople in Germany
Expatriate footballers in Germany
Paraguayan expatriate sportspeople in Mexico
Expatriate footballers in Mexico